Otter Creek is a  tributary of the Susquehanna River in York County, Pennsylvania in the United States.

Otter Creek joins the Susquehanna between Shenks Ferry and York Furnace.

See also
List of rivers of Pennsylvania

References

External links
U.S. Geological Survey: PA stream gaging stations

Rivers of Pennsylvania
Tributaries of the Susquehanna River
Rivers of York County, Pennsylvania